SS Andrew Hamilton was a Liberty ship built in the United States during World War II. She was named after Andrew Hamilton, a Scottish lawyer in the Thirteen Colonies, where he finally settled in Philadelphia. He was best known for his legal victory on behalf of the printer and newspaper publisher John Peter Zenger. This 1735 decision in New York helped to establish that truth is a defense to an accusation of libel. Hamilton, in company with his son-in-law, William Allen, purchased the ground, whereon to erect "a suitable building" to be used as a legislative hall, now known as Independence Hall.

Construction
Andrew Hamilton was laid down on 15 June 1942, under a Maritime Commission (MARCOM) contract, MCE hull 57, by the Bethlehem-Fairfield Shipyard, Baltimore, Maryland; she was sponsored by Mrs. J.E.P. Grant, the wife of the chief of the engineering section, production division of MARCOM, in Washington DC, and was launched on 6 August 1942.

History
She was allocated to International Freighting Corporation, on 17 August 1942. On 14 April 1948, she was laid up in the National Defense Reserve Fleet, Wilmington, North Carolina. She was sold for scrapping on 9 April 1962, to Horton Industries, Inc., for $59,399.89. She was withdrawn from the fleet on 11 May 1962.

References

Bibliography

 
 
 
 

 

Liberty ships
Ships built in Baltimore
1942 ships
Wilmington Reserve Fleet